Ellis Parker Butler (December 5, 1869 – September 13, 1937) was an American author. He was the author of more than 30 books and more than 2,000 stories and essays and is most famous for his short story "Pigs Is Pigs", in which a bureaucratic stationmaster insists on levying the livestock rate for a shipment of two pet guinea pigs, which soon start proliferating exponentially. His most famous character was Philo Gubb.

His career spanned more than forty years, and his stories, poems, and articles were published in more than 225 magazines. His work appeared alongside that of his contemporaries, including Mark Twain, Sax Rohmer, James B. Hendryx, Berton Braley, F. Scott Fitzgerald, Don Marquis, Will Rogers, and Edgar Rice Burroughs.

Despite the enormous volume of his work, Butler was, for most of his life, only a part-time author. He worked full-time as a banker and was very active in his local community. A founding member of both the Dutch Treat Club and the Authors League of America, Butler was an always-present force in the New York City literary scene.

Biography
Butler was born in Muscatine, Iowa on December 5, 1869. He moved to New York City and lived in  Flushing (Queens) New York.

He wrote twenty-five stories for Woman's Home Companion between 1906 and 1935. The stories in the Companion were illustrated by artists including May Wilson Preston, Frederic Dorr Steele, Herbert Paus and Rico Le Brun.

Between 1931 and 1936, at least seventeen of Butler's stories published in newspapers were illustrated by Ethel Hays.

He died in Williamsville, Massachusetts on September 13, 1937, and was interred in Flushing Cemetery.

External links

 
 ebooks of works by Ellis Parker Butler at Project Gutenberg Australia
 
 
 
 Many Ellis Parker Butler stories, including Pigs is Pigs and most of the Perkins of Portland tales, are read in Mister Ron's Basement Podcast, now indexed for convenience
 Online movie of "Pigs is Pigs" produced by the Adam Smith Academy (This link may be out of date.)
 Archive: Partial archive of John Martin's online bibliography and download site.

1869 births
1937 deaths
19th-century American male writers
19th-century American short story writers
20th-century American male writers
20th-century American short story writers
American humorists
American male short story writers
Butler, Ellis
People from Muscatine, Iowa
Writers from Iowa